Legislative elections were held on June 5, 1934 in the Philippines. Manuel L. Quezon and Sergio Osmeña were re-elected in the Philippine Senate and still arch-rivals since the Nacionalista Party broke up in 1922.

Electoral system 
In a staggered election, the seats of the senators who were first disputed in 1922 were up for election. The Philippines is divided into 12 senatorial districts, of which all districts save for the 12th district, has one of its seats up. In the 12th district, any vacancy is filled via appointment of the Governor-General. The election itself is via first-past-the-post.

Results

Aftermath 
This was the last Senate election before 1946, since the Constitutional Convention, elected a month later, abolished the Senate by creating the unicameral National Assembly. The Senate would have been restored with amendments to the constitution that would have been applied in 1941, but World War II broke out and the elected senators would not have served until 1946.

See also
10th Philippine Legislature
Commission on Elections
Politics of the Philippines
Philippine elections

External links
Official website of the Commission on Elections

1934
1934 elections in the Philippines